Zombies (ゾンビ, Zonbi) are recurring antagonists within the fictional universe of Japanese video game company Capcom's multimedia franchise Resident Evil, known in Japan as Biohazard. First appearing in the 1996 video game Resident Evil, they are mutated creatures with cannibalistic urges and severe epidermal necrosis, and their origins are explained from a scientific perspective. In contrast to zombies in other horror and fantasy genre works where they are traditionally presented as corporeal revenants with mythological and supernatural origins, zombies in the Resident Evil series are usually created through the use of biological weaponry, genetic manipulation and/or parasitic symbiosis. Subsequent sequels have featured other types of zombie as well as related creatures which are presented as more agile, vicious, and intelligent opponents.  

The Resident Evil franchise's zombies and associated creatures, a staple feature in the video game series as well as film adaptations, are widely recognized as one of the most memorable video game depictions of horror themes, and represent an influential element of the survival horror genre which have inspired numerous works with similar themes.

Development
The director of the first entry in the Resident Evil series of video games, Shinji Mikami, cited The Evil Dead and The Texas Chain Saw Massacre as influences for his work within the Resident Evil franchise. To explain the origins of zombies within the Resident Evil universe, Mikami chose a virus as the infectious agent or pathogen which turn humans into zombies; during an interview with IGN, Mikami recall "feeling excited by the new idea that a virus—a real enemy that can't be seen by humans—would cause tremendous fear in people". Mikami chose a fixed camera perspective and the implementation of tank controls, which he conceded to be awkward in movement but nevertheless insisted that it was the only method he could think of at the time that could make a horror game work: he explained that in this way the player could not see a zombie coming, yet could still hear its footsteps without knowledge of its exact position.

The depiction of zombie behavior changed greatly as the Resident Evil series expanded. Later titles released after the original Resident Evil would present an escalation of enemy types, introducing new creatures or reinventing pre-established ones. For example, Resident Evil 3 introduced zombies which could sprint and lunge out towards player characters at an unusually rapid pace. For Resident Evil 4, Mikami discarded tank controls which previously served the purpose of intensifying a scary experience, and introduced a new enemy type. Los Ganados ("The Cattle" in Spanish), which have variously been described as "zombie-like non-zombies" or "very-zombie-like-but-not-officially-zombies" by video game journalists, represented a further evolution of the zombie archetype due to their intelligence and nimbleness. In Mikami's view, the horror genre had since transitioned from a preference for direct, physical horror to quiet, psychological horror. He observed that while many players have since developed an immunity to physical horror and the idea of zombies as a scary experience from past decades, in his view nothing scares human beings more than themselves as well as their societies and cultures, which represents a certain horror element that is timeless.

For the remakes of older Resident Evil titles, Capcom's developers could revisit and realize the potential of the original design behind enemies without the technical limitations of dated technology. In the 2002 remake of Resident Evil, zombies which are not successfully dispatched by a head shot may resuscitate as fast-moving "Crimson Heads" resembling the silhouette of the Nosferatu creature. In the original Resident Evil 2, a specialized zombie called the Licker must first drop to the floor from  walls or ceilings in order to engage the player character, even though it is capable of attacking from a distance by design: according to producer Yoshiaki Hirabayashi, this is because the original game was presented with a fixed camera and tank controls which mandated a "stop-and-aim shooting system". In the 2019 Resident Evil 2 remake, the camera is placed behind the player character, which gives the player more freedom to control the camera and aim at enemies. This enables the player to search for a Licker that is attacking from an elevated position, in accordance with the original design. In acknowledgment of the high volume of gore depicted in the remake, producer Tsuyoshi Kanda explained that the notion of "truly terrifying zombies" is one of the title's major concepts, and that the developers spent much time and effort to convey "damage impact that feels weighty and real" when player characters repeatedly shoot at zombies as they come at them relentlessly. Kanda noted that high-resolution visuals are rendered and designed in incredible detail, which are then used as the basis to create their "world of wetness and darkness".

With regards to the primary enemy units of Resident Evil 7: Biohazard known as the Molded, producer Jun Takeuchi commented that their name infers that there may be a human intention to mould or create something as part of the backstory of these creatures, and that a deliberate creative decision is made by developers to move away from a virus as the source of mass infection that leads to the biohazard incidents in the narratives of previous titles.

Appearances

Video games
Zombies are introduced in the first Resident Evil as primitive yet deadly creatures roaming the derelict Spencer Mansion. They exhibit a shambling behavior similar to the zombie films of the 1970s, in particular George A. Romero's  Night of the Living Dead film series. They moan and relentlessly shuffle towards player characters with arms outstretched and little finesse, and while their slow movement speed offers ample time for players to respond, zombies may absorb nearly a full pistol clip before falling. Unlike Tyrants, which are Bio Organic Weapons (B.O.W.) by design, zombies are often unintentional side-effects of humans who are infected by the T-virus, a name given to a series of Progenitor virus strains which causes death or drastic mutations to its hosts by the pharmaceutical conglomerate Umbrella Corporation, the primary antagonistic faction in the franchise's earlier games. A popular tactic to dispatch zombies is with precise lined up shots to the head, while other players may opt to conserve ammo by waiting for the zombies to veer slightly off course and attempt to run past them.  Resident Evil 2 and Resident Evil 3 present a zombie apocalypse scenario where zombies appear in larger numbers, overrunning the entirety of the fictional Raccoon City which is located near the first game's mansion. They are presented as more limber in movement, though they may be knocked down when they take enough damage and dismembered if players target a specific body part.

Other zombie-type creatures in the series include domesticated canines infected with the T-virus, also known as the zombie dog (ゾンビ犬 zombi-inu). Unlike the slower human zombies, zombie dogs retain much of their agility with a noticeable increase in durability and aggression. Zombie dogs are usually depicted with active necrosis, for example a visible eye bulge out of their otherwise savage but proportional facade, which makes for a fearsome appearance. Most of the zombie dogs encountered in the early Resident Evil games are of the Dobermann breed: the reason for the frequency was due to Chief Brian Irons' suggestion to the K9 unit that the breed be used as the police dog for the Raccoon Police Department. Resident Evil 2 also introduced the Licker, a grotesque creature with an exposed brain and lacks skin, which attacks its prey with sharp claws and a long prehensile tongue. It is the result of further mutation in a zombie infected with certain strains of the T-virus, especially one that has consumed large quantities of biomass to sustain its metabolism. It is blind but extremely sensitive to sound, which can be mitigated with navigational tactics by savvy players. A Licker variant which appears in Resident Evil 5 is presented with a “fairly unremarkable sense of hearing", reflecting the game's action-oriented focus compared to its predecessors.
 
Resident Evil Zero introduced zombies which are swarmed and infested by T-virus infected leeches, which require players to adopt a different approach to overcome in combat. They are similar in concept to the later "Ooze" zombie type introduced in Resident Evil: Revelations, both of which are visually and functionally distinct from the more humanoid traditional zombie.  Resident Evil 7: Biohazard feature the Molded, semi-morphous black goo-like anthropomorphic monsters spawned from a type of isotropic mould that feeds on dead bodies. By coagulating through cracks and crevices, they can seemingly appear from out of nowhere to shamble towards the player, and their heads bob awkwardly and arrhythmically from side to side which may prove problematic for aiming. Resident Evil Village features the moroaică of Castle Dimitrescu, lumbering shackled creatures described as being very similar to the franchise's traditional zombies. According to the lore of Village, they are the result of Lady Dimitrescu's experimentation with the Mold pathogen from Biohazard. 

Some later Resident Evil titles feature enemies which retain some semblance of intellectual faculty and are very different from the zombie archetype in earlier titles. The Los Ganados of Resident Evil 4 are infected by body-altering parasitic lifeforms known as Las Plagas: they are capable of speech, somewhat agile, and possess adequate cognitive ability to utilize combat tactics like hurling axes and dynamite at the player character. Luis Sera, a supporting character in Resident Evil 4, compared these creatures to three species of flukes that can influence their hosts' behavior: Dicrocoelium dendriticum, Galactosomum and Leucochloridium paradoxum. The parasites may sprout from certain individuals who have been decapitated and attack the player character when in close proximity. The Majini of Resident Evil 5 are similarly infected with the Las Plagas parasite, though they tend to be better armed with military grade weapons, which serves as the pretext for cover-based firefights as a gameplay mechanic. Resident Evil 6 features two types of zombie-like antagonists created from the newer C-virus: shambling zombies created through indirect exposure to the C-virus that behave similarly to the nimble main enemies of Resident Evil 4 and Resident Evil 5 though with diminished mental capacity, and the J'avo, created through direct administration of the C-virus. When the J'avo experience dismemberment or are sufficiently damaged, they exhibit regenerative abilities which cause drastic mutations similar in concept to hosts of the Las Plagas parasite. The spin-off title Resident Evil: Revelations 2 feature the Afflicted, which are insane human beings who have been severely tortured and bound in a mass of metal wire and spikes.

Other appearances 
Zombies have appeared in every live action Resident Evil film, and animated films like Resident Evil: Vendetta. Outside of recurring appearances in Resident Evil video game titles and animated films, the Licker has appeared in live action adaptations such as the Resident Evil film series directed by Paul W. S. Anderson, the 2021 film Resident Evil: Welcome to Raccoon City, and the 2022 Netflix television series.

Reception and analysis
In his essay titled "How the Zombies Changed Videogames", Matthew J. Weise analyzed at length the presentation of zombies throughout the history of the Resident Evil franchise. He described the first Resident Evil game as the "Ur-Text", and that Mikami created a "zombie game" in the same manner as a zombie film, a "media artifact built solely around the figure", the zombie. He formed a view that on retrospect, the zombies of Resident Evil represented a struggle to reconcile modern conventions of zombie behavior with certain video game conventions. On Mikami's choice to ground the franchise's antagonists from a scientific perspective, which involves an infectious pathogen, Weiss observed that the developers chose not to model the progression of zombie infection on the player characters, instead opting for conventional notions of health meter damage with considerations for marketable balance and player empowerment. Weiss argued that the developers have essentially engaged in a process called "selective abstraction", where they picked and chose which video game conventions would be superseded by common zombie fiction conventions, and vice versa. Weiss concluded that the franchise's biggest contribution to gaming aesthetics are its difficulty design and ability to instill a sense of vulnerability in players, as well as the depiction of its zombies to be as dangerous as their film counterparts, echoing the portrayal of the value of forethought versus panic within apocalyptic circumstances in Romero's films. 

Commentators have attributed the enduring popularity of the zombie archetype popularized by early Resident Evil games, in part, to the fact that zombie enemies are not expected to exhibit significant levels of intelligence, making them relatively straightforward to program. On the other hand, Mielke opined that Resident Evil 4 was a successful attempt at adhering to a proven formula while changing its conventions, and that the move away from the Umbrella Corporation storyline and "proper zombies"  was a welcome change for the series. To Patrick Shanley from The Hollywood Reporter, Resident Evil 4 "nailed dread and had such a cool tweak on the classic zombie formula" which highlights the elasticity of the "zombie" term, and demonstrates other possibilities which can be explored with the creature archetype. Shanley's colleague Richard Newby shared similar sentiments and suggested that the Las Plagas parasite introduced in Resident Evil 4 further broadened the zombie genre.

Certain specific zombie-type creatures, such as the zombie dog and the licker, has received particular attention from video game journalists. IGN said the zombie dog jump scare scene in the first game sets a defining tone of "gnawing unease" for the rest of Resident Evil, particularly if the player character walks past another window. Both The Guardian and Kotaku considered the zombie dog window scene to be one of the greatest video games jump scares; Kotaku′s Cameron Kunzelman in particular emphasized it as the "original moment in frightening PlayStation users". Destructoid called the window scene an "amazingly scary sequence". The Licker has appeared in multiple "top" lists by critics, which highlight it as one of the greatest or scariest enemies in video games. As it is associated with the franchise's brand identity, the Licker has been the subject of multiple items of merchandise.

Aaron Potter from PCGamesN felt that Capcom have restored their signature zombies to the "threatening and unrelenting force" they once were with 2019's Resident Evil 2, following a period of time where the franchise's zombies are seen to have lost their scariness. In particular, Potter said the idea of "wetness" as conveyed by Kanda sets apart the gore in 2019's Resident Evil 2 from the presentation seen in most other horror-themed video games, noting the "horrendous ways the human anatomy can be mutilated" and the gruesome displays of gore that follow whenever zombies are dispatched by players. Robert Zak from GamesRadar+ formed a view that the Molded serve as a precursor to the zombies of the 2019 Resident Evil 2 remake, which was released two years after Resident Evil 7, and opined that this is an intentional design decision for players to rediscover the horror of confronting slow moving enemies within tight spaces, as the movements of both types of creatures seemingly parallel each other.

Impact  

Various commentators, including George A. Romero and British actor Simon Pegg, credited zombies as portrayed in the Resident Evil series to be a major factor behind the revitalization and subsequent prevalence of zombies in early 21st century popular culture. Jamie Russell in particular described the resulting cultural impact as the "Resident Evil effect". The realistic, scientific approach for explaining zombie origins became a standard trope in popular fictional works released after the first Resident Evil video game. Tim Turi from Game Informer formed a similar view that the varied depictions of zombies and related monsters throughout the history of Resident Evil are trend setting, in particular marking the zombie genre's shift from supernatural themes to scientific themes. James Mielke from IGN commented that zombies as presented by Shinji Mikami and Capcom represented an evolution of the zombie archetype and are continually reinvented as a mass-market concern, the franchise setting the tone for the survival horror genre and achieving immense commercial success in a manner which its contemporaries did not achieve: the video game series sold 100 million units worldwide by 2020, and by 2011 the Resident Evil film adaptations was described by Guinness Book of World Records as the most successful film series based on video games. 

Kim Newman drew attention to the fact that many zombie films released after Resident Evil tend to dwell on a more action-oriented approach between protagonists and their zombie antagonists compared to films from prior generations, which Newman deduced as a significant influence from the video game genre. Josh Levin from Slate credited the Resident Evil video games as among the sources of inspiration behind the mainstream popularization of a new type of zombie, the fast zombie or running zombie, since the early 2010's and mentioned the franchise's zombie dogs as a notable example.

References

Further reading

Capcom antagonists
Fictional monsters
Fictional parasites and parasitoids
Mutant characters in video games
Resident Evil characters
Science fiction film characters
Science fiction weapons
Video game characters introduced in 1996
Zombie and revenant characters in video games